Saint-Georges-sur-la-Prée is a commune in the Cher department in the Centre-Val de Loire region of France.

Geography

Population

Sights
 The church of St. Georges, dating from the twelfth century.
 The château de Rozay, dating from the fifteenth century.
 A sixteenth-century priory on the foundations of the old abbey of Dèvres.
 A museum and art gallery.

See also
Communes of the Cher department

References

External links

Official website of Saint-Georges-sur-la-Prée 

Communes of Cher (department)
Bituriges Cubi